Paul James Lewis (born 17 December 1994) is an English footballer who plays as a central midfielder for League Two club Tranmere Rovers.

Club career

Macclesfield Town
Having been promoted to the senior team in May 2013 by his former youth team manager John Askey, Lewis made his debut for Macclesfield Town on Tuesday 13 August 2013 against Lincoln City at Sincil Bank in a 1–0 defeat. He would only play sporadically from August to December, most notably scoring an injury time winner against Forest Green Rovers on 12 October 2013. Lewis would play more frequently from December until the end of the season, making 21 league appearances including 12 from the substitutes bench.

Lewis would begin the 2014–15 season as a regular starter in central midfield. In an FA Trophy fixture against Wrexham on 28 October, Lewis broke his collarbone within the first 15 seconds of the match. Prior to this injury, he had made 15 league appearances, scoring 3 goals including a winner against Dover Athletic on 18 October. This injury sidelined him until the middle of January, after which he would return to the playing squad in the final four months of the season. Macclesfield narrowly missed out on a place in the play-offs, finishing sixth. He finished the season with 27 league appearances and 4 goals

After signing a new one-year contract, Lewis would again start the season playing regularly. With the exception a one-month absence between September and October, he would continue to feature in the starting team through the rest of 2015. In a league match against Tranmere Rovers on 2 January 2016, he picked up a hamstring injury leading to him being substituted after 22 minutes. For the remainder of the season, Lewis would struggle for fitness and was unable to get a run of games in the Macclesfield team, featuring only four more times that season. Across the season he made 25 league appearances, scoring a career-best 5 goals in all competitions.

Cambridge United
On 13 January 2017, Lewis signed a three and a half year contract with League Two club Cambridge United for an undisclosed fee. He was an unused sub the following day in a 0–0 draw at home to Blackpool. He made his first appearance for the club a week later replacing Max Clark in the 72 minute with the score being 2–1 to Mansfield Town who would go on to win 3–1.

Dover Athletic (loan)
On 22 September 2017, Lewis joined Dover Athletic on loan going straight into the available squad for the following day's away fixture to Guiseley. He did come on for Dover against Guiseley replacing goalscorer Nortei Nortey in a game that finished 1–1. He made his first start for the club the following week against Solihull Moors; setting up a late winner for Ryan Bird. The 1–0 victory sent Dover to the top of the league

Northampton Town
Lewis played for Northampton Town for the 2020/21 season before returning to Tranmere Rovers.

Tranmere Rovers
Lewis re-joined Tranmere in 2022 and currently remains at the club.

International career
Lewis was called up to the England C squad to face the Cyprus U21 national team on 5 February 2015 along with teammate Andy Halls for a friendly match. He made his debut as a half-time substitute in a 2–1 defeat. As of August 2016, he has not had any further call-ups.

Career statistics

Honours
Tranmere Rovers
EFL Trophy runner-up: 2020–21

References

1994 births
Living people
English footballers
Association football midfielders
Macclesfield Town F.C. players
Cambridge United F.C. players
Dover Athletic F.C. players
Tranmere Rovers F.C. players
Northampton Town F.C. players
National League (English football) players
English Football League players